Alor Pipasa is a Bengali drama film directed by Tarun Majumder and produced by Debesh Ghosh based on a same name novel of Balai Chand Mukhopadhyay. This film was released on 15 January 1965 under the banner of D.R. Productions. Music of the movie was done by Hemanta Mukherjee.

Plot
This is the story of Roshnibai, a prostitute who hide her identity to keep her child safe and sacrifices her life for him. A senior doctor narrating the heart touching story of Roshni's struggle to a junior doctor who is actually the son of Roshnibai.

Cast
 Pahadi Sanyal as Doctor
 Basanta Choudhury
 Anup Kumar as Sohan Lal
 Sandhya Roy as Roshnibai
 Bhanu Bandopadhyay
 Anubha Gupta as Nila
 Asit Baran as Partha
 Jahor Roy as Dashu
 Satindra Bhattacharya
 Asha Devi
 Bhanu Ghosh
 Mani Srimani
 Sabita Sinha
 Sunit Mukherjee

Soundtrack
"Minati Mor Tomar Paaye" - Sandhya Mukhopadhyay
"Kaschitkanta Biraha Guruna" - Hemant Kumar
"Abke Sawan Ghar Aaja" - Rajesh Kumari
"Balam Matware" - Rajesh Kumari
"Ghir Aai Badariya" - Lata Mangeshkar
"Aaja Piya" - Sandhya Mukhopadhyay
"Na Bajaiho Shyam Bairi Bansuri" - Lata Mangeshkar
"Bidyudwantang Lalita Banita" -Hemant Kumar
"Shrinnante Vishwe Amitatsya Putra" - Hemant Kumar

References

External links
 

1965 films
Bengali-language Indian films
Indian drama films
1965 drama films
Films directed by Tarun Majumdar
Films scored by Hemant Kumar
Films based on Indian novels
Indian black-and-white films
1960s Bengali-language films
Films based on works by Balai Chand Mukhopadhyay